The 2017–18 Stephen F. Austin Ladyjacks basketball team represented Stephen F. Austin University during the 2017–18 NCAA Division I women's basketball season. The Ladyjacks were led by third year head coach Mark Kellogg and played their home games at the William R. Johnson Coliseum. They were members of the Southland Conference. They finish the season 25–7, 12–6 in Southland play to finish in second place. They advanced to the championship game of the Southland women's tournament where they lost to Nicholls State. They received an at-large bid to the WNIT where they lost in the first round to George Mason.

Previous season
The Ladyjacks finished the 2016–17 season with and overall record of 25–8 and 14–4 in Southland play to finish in fourth place. They lost in the finals of the Southland women's tournament to Central Arkansas. The Ladyjacks were invited to the WBI losing in the first round to UT-RGV.

Roster
Sources:

Schedule

|-
!colspan=9 style=| Non-conference regular season

|-
!colspan=9 style=| Southland Conference regular season

|-
!colspan=9 style=| Southland Women's Tournament

|-
!colspan=9 style=| WNIT

See also
 2017–18 Stephen F. Austin Lumberjacks basketball team

References

Stephen F. Austin Ladyjacks basketball seasons
Stephen F. Austin
Stephen F. Austin Ladyjacks basketball
Stephen F. Austin Ladyjacks basketball
Stephen